Jonathan Joseph Malo (born September 29, 1983) is a Canadian professional baseball shortstop who is a free agent. Malo has competed for the Canada national baseball team.

Career
Malo went to Collège Montmorency. He enrolled at Miami-Dade College, before transferring to Northeastern Oklahoma A&M College. He also played for the Associés de Laval of the Ligue de Baseball Élite du Québec, a collegiate summer baseball league, from 2001 through 2003.

The Mets drafted Malo in the 40th round (1,197th overall) of the 2002 Major League Baseball draft, but he did not sign, opting to college. They drafted him again in the 48th round (1,413rd overall) of the 2003 Major League Baseball draft, and again did not sign. He signed with the Mets as an undrafted free agent in 2004. He made his professional debut with the Brooklyn Cyclones of the Class-A Short Season New York–Penn League in 2005. He played for the St. Lucie Mets of the Class-A Advanced Florida State League in 2006, winning the league championship. He was promoted to the Binghamton Mets of the Class-AA Eastern League for the first time in 2008. He split the 2009, 2010, and 2011 seasons between the Binghamton Mets and the Buffalo Bisons of the Class-AAA International League. In 2012, he played for the Québec Capitales of the Canadian-American Association. Malo was a member of the Capitales through the 2019 season, hitting .281/.360/.402 with 39 home runs and 247 RBI in 8 seasons with the club.

International career
Malo was selected for the Canada national baseball team at the 2009 Baseball World Cup, 2011 Pan American Games, 2011 Baseball World Cup, 2013 World Baseball Classic, 2017 World Baseball Classic, 2019 Pan American Games and 2019 WBSC Premier12.

In the 2009 Baseball World Cup, winning the bronze medal.

In 2011, he participated in the 2011 Pan American Games, winning the gold medal, and the 2011 Baseball World Cup, in which he was named to the All-Tournament Team.

References

External links

1983 births
Living people
Baseball people from Quebec
Baseball players at the 2011 Pan American Games
Baseball players at the 2019 Pan American Games
Baseball shortstops
Binghamton Mets players
Brooklyn Cyclones players
Buffalo Bisons (minor league) players
Canadian expatriate baseball players in the United States
Miami Dade Sharks baseball players
Northeastern Oklahoma A&M College alumni
Pan American Games gold medalists for Canada
Pan American Games medalists in baseball
Pan American Games silver medalists for Canada
People from Joliette
Québec Capitales players
St. Lucie Mets players
World Baseball Classic players of Canada
2013 World Baseball Classic players
2017 World Baseball Classic players
2019 WBSC Premier12 players
Medalists at the 2019 Pan American Games
Medalists at the 2011 Pan American Games